Amphipneustes brevisternalis is a species of sea urchin of the family Temnopleuridae. Their armour is covered with spines. It is placed in the genus Amphipneustes and lives in the sea. Amphipneustes brevisternalis was first scientifically described in 1926 by Koehler.

See also 
Ammotrophus platyterus
Amphipneustes bifidus
Amphipneustes davidi

References 

Amphipneustes
Animals described in 1926